TVS Group is an Indian multinational conglomerate with its principal headquarters in Madurai and international headquarters in Chennai. It has more than 50 subsidiaries including the two-wheeler manufacturer TVS Motor Company and TVS Supply Chain Solutions.

Subsidiaries
The group's subsidiaries are owned by three holding companies, viz., TVS & Sons, Sundaram Industries and TVS Holding Companies. TVS & Sons is the parent company of the group.
The three holding companies of the subsidiaries are:
T. V. Sundram Iyengar & Sons Private Ltd. (TVS & Sons)
Sundaram Industries Private Ltd.
Southern Roadways Private Ltd. (TVS Holding Companies)

TVS Group's nine listed subsidiaries are:
TVS Motor Company
Sundaram Fasteners
Sundaram Clayton
TVS Srichakra
Wheels India
India Motor Parts & Accessories
India Nippon Electricals
TVS Electronics
Sundaram Brake Linings
TVS Real Estate (TVS Emerald)

TVS Group's unlisted subsidiaries include:
TVS Supply Chain Solutions 
Brakes India
Turbo Energy
TVS Investments
Axles India
Sundaram Textiles
TVS Tread
Sun Tyre & Wheel Systems
Sundaram Dynacast
TVS Automobile Solutions
TVS Industrial & Logistics Parks
Lucas-TVS
Delphi-TVS
TVS Next

See also
Sundaram Finance, a former subsidiary of the group which now operates independently

References

External links
 

Companies based in Tamil Nadu
Companies based in Madurai
Indian companies established in 1911
TVS Group
Conglomerate companies established in 1911